Lauryn is a given name. Notable people with the name include:

Lauryn Chandler, American author of contemporary romance novels
Lauryn Hill (born 1975), American recording artist, musician, producer and actress
Lauryn Mark, Olympic Women's Skeet shooter from Australia
Lauryn Ogilvie, Australian sport shooter
Lauryn Williams (born 1983), track and field sprint athlete, competing internationally for the United States

See also
Lauren
Laurin

English feminine given names